A frame of reference consists of an abstract coordinate system and the set of physical reference points.

Frame of reference or reference frame may also refer to:
Linguistic frame of reference
Frame of reference (marketing), a phrase used to identify how a new product, service, or concept is consciously placed within a marketplace
Reference frame (video), frames of a compressed video that are used to define future frames
Frames of Reference, 1960 educational film

See also
Framing (disambiguation)